The second principal meridian, or Paoli Meridian, coincides with 86° 28′ of longitude west from Greenwich, starts from a point two and one half miles west of the confluence of the Little Blue and Ohio rivers, runs north to the northern boundary of Indiana, and, with the base line in latitude 38° 28′ 20″, governs the surveys in Indiana and part of those in Illinois.

Sources

See also
List of principal and guide meridians and base lines of the United States

External links

2
Meridians (geography)